Xestia fabulosa is a species of cutworm or dart moth in the family Noctuidae. It is found in North America.

The MONA or Hodges number for Xestia fabulosa is 10958.

References

Further reading

 
 
 

Xestia
Articles created by Qbugbot
Moths described in 1965